Noya etymologically is not a Hebrew name though it sounds homophonically like the similarly sounding Hebrew proper name Noʿah' (Hebrew נועה or נוח). Noa was one of the Five Daughters of Zelophehad. 

In this sense "Noʿah" and not "Noya" means "rest or "repose" and has absolutely nothing to do the Indian name Noya which will be elaborated below."

Yet, Noya is in fact an Indian name derived from Sanskrit word "Naya" cf. Sanskrit: अहो साधु meaning “New, Renewal, Fresh” cf. Persian now "نو" meaning "new". Hence it is a common mistakte to mix up the name Noya wirh the Hebrew one Noa or Noah. Another meaning for Noya is "ornament"

Notes

Hebrew feminine given names